West Cork, a division of County Cork, was a parliamentary constituency  in Ireland, represented in the Parliament of the United Kingdom. From 1885 to 1922 it returned one Member of Parliament (MP) to the House of Commons of the United Kingdom of Great Britain and Ireland.

Until the 1885 general election the area was part of the Cork County constituency. From 1922, on the establishment of the Irish Free State, it was not represented in the Parliament of the United Kingdom.

Boundaries
This constituency comprised the baronies of Bantry, Bear and West Carbery (West Division) and that part of the barony of West Carbery (East Division) consisting of the parishes of Aghadown, Clear Island, Creagh (except the townlands of Gortnaclohy and Smorane), and Tullagh.

Members of Parliament

Elections

Elections in the 1880s

Elections in the 1890s

Elections in the 1900s

Elections in the 1910s

Notes

The 1916 by-election, which contrasted so obviously with Gilhooly's long tenure of the seat, was viewed as a farce by Unionist opinion.

Notes

Sources

Tony Williams, House of Commons Information Office

Michael Stenton and Stephen Lees, Who's Who in British Members of Parliament 1919-1945 p. 156 (Hayes)
Michael Stenton and Stephen Lees, Who's Who in British Members of Parliament 1886-1918 p. 136 (Gilhooley), p. 273 (O'Leary)

Westminster constituencies in County Cork (historic)
Dáil constituencies in the Republic of Ireland (historic)
Constituencies of the Parliament of the United Kingdom established in 1885
Constituencies of the Parliament of the United Kingdom disestablished in 1922